Oradea metropolitan area ( or short ZMO) is a metropolitan area located in Western Romania, in the County of Bihor, Crişana, Transylvania, Romania and was founded on 9 May 2005.

According to Eurostat, in 2007 Oradea had a larger urban zone of 218,518 residents on an area of 125 km2. , the Oradea functional urban area has a population of 239,390 residents.

Composition
The metropolitan area comprises the city of Oradea and 11 adjacent communes:
Biharia
Borş
Cetariu
Girișu de Criș
Ineu
Nojorid
Oșorhei
Paleu
Sânmartin
Sântandrei
Toboliu

Population and ethnic structure
In 2011, the population of the metropolitan area was 235,462.

The population structure comprises:
 70% Romanians
 24% Hungarians
 6% Roma and others

Membership
Oradea metropolitan area is a member of the METREX EU network.

References

External links
 Zona metropolitană Oradea - Prezentare multimedia
 
 
 
  Metropolitan Oradea Area - Osorhei
 https://web.archive.org/web/20110724042504/http://www.roeu.net/zona/oradea1en/

Geography of Bihor County
Metropolitan areas of Romania